Khvārvarān was a military quarter of the Sasanian Empire. Intensive irrigation agriculture of the lower Tigris and Euphrates and of tributaries such as the Diyala and Karun formed the main resource base of the Sassanid monarchy.

Etymology
The Arabic term Iraq was not used at this time; in the mid-6th century the Iranian Empire under Sasanian dynasty was divided by Khosrow I into four quarters, of which the western one, called Khvārvarān, included most of modern Iraq, and subdivided to provinces of Meshan, Asuristan, Adiabene and Media. The term Iraq is widely used in the medieval Arabic sources for the area in the centre and south of the modern republic as a geographic rather than a political term, implying no precise boundaries.

The area of modern Iraq north of Tikrit was known in Muslim times as Al-Jazirah, which means "The Island" and refers to the "island" between the Tigris and Euphrates rivers. To the south and west lay the Arabian deserts, inhabited largely by Arab tribesmen who occasionally acknowledged the overlordship of the Sasanian Emperors.

Until 602, the desert frontier of greater Iran had been guarded by the Lakhmid kings of Al-Hira, who were themselves Arabs but who ruled a settled buffer state. In that year, Shahanshah Khosrow II Aparviz rashly abolished the Lakhmid kingdom and laid the frontier open to nomad incursions. Farther north, the western quarter was bounded by the Byzantine Empire. The frontier more or less followed the modern Syria-Iraq border and continued northward into modern Turkey, leaving Nisibis (modern Nusaybin) as the Sasanian frontier fortress while the Byzantines held Dara and nearby Amida (modern Diyarbakır).

Ethnic diversity and religion
The inhabitants were very mixed. There was an aristocratic and administrative Persian upper class, but most of the population were Aramaic-speaking peasants and townsfolk. There were a number of Tāzis (Arabs), most of whom lived as pastoralists along the western margins of the settled lands, but some lived as townspeople, especially in Hireh (al-Hira). In addition, there was a surprisingly large number of Greeks, mostly prisoners captured during the numerous Sasanian campaigns into Byzantine Syria.

Ethnic diversity was matched by religious pluralism. The Sasanian state religion, Zoroastrian religion, was largely confined to the Iranians. The rest of the population, especially in Mesopotamia and the northern parts of the country, were Christians. These were sharply divided by doctrinal differences into Monophysites, linked to the Jacobite church of Syria, and Nestorians.

The Nestorians, who originally converted from Ashurism and Manichaenism, were the most widespread and were tolerated by the Sasanian Emperors because of their opposition to the Christians of the Roman Empire, who regarded the Nestorians as heretics. Many of those Iranian Nestorians were deported to southern provinces, located south of Persian Gulf, such as Mishmāhig (modern Bahrain and UAE), Garrhae (modern Saudi cost of Persian Gulf). The Monophysites were regarded with more suspicion and were occasionally persecuted, but both groups were able to maintain an ecclesiastical hierarchy, and the Nestorians had an important intellectual centre at Nisibis. The area around the ancient city of Babylon by this time had a large population of Jews, both descendants of the exiles of Old Testament times and local converts. In addition, in the southern half of the country there were numerous adherents of the old Babylonian paganism, as well as Mandaeans and Gnostics.

In the early 7th century, the stability and prosperity of this multicultural society were threatened by invasion. In 602, Khosrow II Aparviz launched the last great Iranian invasion of the Byzantine Empire. At first, he was spectacularly successful; Syria and Egypt fell, and Constantinople itself was threatened. Later, the tide began to turn, and in 627-628, the Byzantines, under the leadership of the Heraclius, invaded Khvārvarān province and sacked the imperial capital at Tyspawn (Ctesiphon). The invaders did not remain, but Khosrow was discredited, deposed, and executed.

There followed a period of infighting among generals and members of the Imperial family that left the country without clear leadership. The chaos had also damaged irrigation systems, and it was probably at this time that large areas in the south of the country reverted to marshlands, which they have remained ever since. It was with this devastated land that the earliest Muslim raiders came into contact.

The Arab conquest and the early Islamic period

The first conflict between local Arab-Bedouin tribes and Iranian forces seems to have been in 634, when the Arabs were defeated at the Battle of the Bridge.  There was a force of some 5,000 Muslims under Abu 'Ubayd ath-Thaqafi was routed by the Iranians. In 637, a much larger Arab force under Sa'ad ibn Abi Waqqas defeated the main Iranian army at the battle of Al-Qadisiyya and moved on to sack the capital of the Iranian Empire the Ctesiphon. By the end of the following year (638), the Muslims had conquered almost all of Western Iranian provinces (modern Iraq), and the last Sasanian Emperor, Yazdegerd III, had fled to central and then northern Iran, where he was killed in 651.

The Islamic conquest was followed by mass immigration of Arabs from eastern Arabia and Mazun (Oman) to Khvarvaran. These new arrivals did not disperse and settle throughout the country; instead they established two new garrison cities, at Al-Kufah, near ancient Babylon, and at Basra in the south.

The intention was that the Muslims should be a separate community of fighting men and their families living off taxes paid by the local inhabitants. Mosul began to emerge as the most important city and the base of a Muslim governor and garrison. Apart from those Iranian elite and the Zoroastrian priests who did not convert to Islam, lost their lives, and their property was confiscated, most of the Iranian peoples became Muslim and were allowed to keep their possessions.

Khvarvaran, now became a province of the Muslim Caliphate with a new name called Iraq.

At first, the capital of the Caliphate was at Madinah (al-Medina), but, after the murder of the third caliph, 'Uthman, in 656, his successor, the Prophet's cousin and son-in-law 'Ali, made Iraq his base. In 661, however, 'Ali was murdered in Al-Kufah, and the caliphate passed to the rival Umayyad family in Syria. This ancient Iranian province became a subordinate province, even though it was the richest area of the Muslim world and the one with the largest Muslim population.

See also 
 Parthian Empire

Sources
S., Suren-Pahlav, Khvārvarān Province (Nowadays Iraq), (1999).

History of Mesopotamia
Sasanian Empire
Ancient history of Iraq